Presidential elections were held in Chile on September 16 and 17, 1829, through a system of electors.

Background
The newly enacted Constitution of 1828 provided that the President was to be chosen by electors. Two hundred and sixteen electors, three for each congressman, were to be chosen. Each elector voted for two names, without specifying which vote was for President or Vice President.

The election was subject to abuses, so electors gave their vote to Francisco Antonio Pinto and to Joaquín Vicuña. 

Even though Pinto was accepted as President, his resignation and replacement by Vice President Joaquín Vicuña triggered the Chilean Civil War of 1829.

Results

References

Presidential elections in Chile
Chile
Chilean Civil War of 1829–30
1829 in Chile
September 1829 events
Election and referendum articles with incomplete results